The 2017–18 Coupe de la Ligue was the 24th edition of the French league cup competition. The winners of the league cup earned a place in the 2018–19 Europa League starting in the second qualifying round. Forty-four clubs will participate in the competition.

Paris Saint-Germain were the four-time defending champions after winning the cup in the previous four seasons, and they won a fifth consecutive title and eighth title overall by defeating Monaco 3–0 in the final.

First round
Eleven first round matches were played on 8 August 2017. The twelfth scheduled match was awarded to Nancy as a walkover after Bastia had their professional status removed by the FFF, and thereby did not qualify to participate according to the rules of the competition.

Second round
Six second round matches were played between the first round winners on 22 August 2017.

Third round
The draw for the third round matches was held on 20 September 2017. Two matches were played on 24 October 2017 and eight matches were played on 25 October 2017.

Notes

Round of 16
The draw for the Round of 16 matches was held on 8 November 2017.

Quarter-finals
The draw for the quarter-final matches was held on 13 December 2017.

Semi-finals
The draw for the semi-final matches was held on 10 January 2018.

Final

The final was held on 31 March 2018 at the Nouveau Stade de Bordeaux.

See also
 2017–18 Ligue 1
 2017–18 Ligue 2
 2017–18 Championnat National

References

External links
 Official site  

2017-18
France 2
League Cup